Territoire de la Côte Ouest is the agglomeration community, an intercommunal structure, centred on the city of Saint-Paul. It is located in Réunion, an overseas department and region of France. It was created in December 2001. Its seat is in Le Port. Its area is 537.2 km2. Its population was 210,928 in 2018, of which 103,492 in Saint-Paul proper.

Composition
The communauté d'agglomération consists of the following 5 communes:
Le Port
La Possession
Saint-Leu
Saint-Paul
Les Trois-Bassins

References

Agglomeration communities in France
Intercommunalities of Réunion